Lord of the Flies is a 1954 novel by the Nobel Prize-winning British author William Golding. The plot concerns a group of British boys who are stranded on an uninhabited island and their disastrous attempts to govern themselves. Themes include the tension between groupthink and individuality, between rational and emotional reactions, and between morality and immorality.

The novel, which was Golding's debut, was generally well received. It was named in the Modern Library 100 Best Novels, reaching number 41 on the editor's list, and 25 on the reader's list. In 2003, it was listed at number 70 on the BBC's The Big Read poll, and in 2005 Time magazine named it as one of the 100 best English-language novels published between 1923 and 2005, and included it in its list of the 100 Best Young-Adult Books of All Time. Popular reading in schools, especially in the English-speaking world, Lord of the Flies was ranked third in the nation's favourite books from school in a 2016 UK poll.

Background 
Published in 1954, Lord of the Flies was Golding's first novel. The concept arose after Golding read what he deemed to be an unrealistic portrayal of stranded children in the youth novel The Coral Island: a Tale of the Pacific Ocean (1857) by R. M. Ballantyne, which includes themes of the civilising effect of Christianity and the importance of hierarchy and leadership. Golding asked his wife, Ann, if it would "be a good idea if I wrote a book about children on an island, children who behave in the way children really would behave?" As a result, the novel contains various references to The Coral Island, such as the rescuing naval officer's description of the boys' initial attempts at civilised cooperation as a "[j]olly good show.  Like the Coral Island." Golding's three central characters (Ralph, Piggy, and Jack) have also been interpreted as caricatures of Ballantyne's Coral Island protagonists.

The manuscript was rejected by many publishers before finally being accepted by London-based Faber & Faber; an initial rejection by the professional reader, Miss Perkins, at Faber labelled the book an "Absurd and uninteresting fantasy about the explosion of an atomic bomb on the colonies and a group of children who land in the jungle near New Guinea. Rubbish and dull. Pointless". However, Charles Monteith decided to take on the manuscript and worked with Golding to complete several fairly major edits, including the removal of the entire first section of the novel, which had previously described an evacuation from nuclear war. The character of Simon was heavily redacted by Monteith, removing his interaction with a mysterious lone figure who is never identified but implied to be God. Monteith himself was concerned about these changes, completing "tentative emendations", and warning against "turning Simon into a prig". Ultimately, Golding made all of Monteith's recommended edits and wrote back in his final letter to his editor that "I've lost any kind of objectivity I ever had over this novel and can hardly bear to look at it." These manuscripts and typescripts are now available from the Special Collections Archives at the University of Exeter library for further study and research. The collection includes the original 1952 "Manuscript Notebook" (originally a Bishop Wordsworth's School notebook) containing copious edits and strikethroughs.

After the changes made by Monteith, and slow sales of the three thousand copy first printing, the book went on to become a best-seller, with more than ten million copies sold as of 2015. It has been adapted to film twice in English, in 1963 by Peter Brook and 1990 by Harry Hook, and once in Filipino by Lupita A. Concio (1975).

The book begins with the boys' arrival on the island after their plane has been shot down during what seems to be part of a nuclear World War III. Some of the marooned characters are ordinary students, while others arrive as a musical choir under an established leader. With the exception of Sam, Eric, and the choirboys, they appear never to have encountered each other before. The book portrays their descent into savagery; left to themselves on a paradisiacal island, far from modern civilisation, the well-educated boys regress to a primitive state.

Plot 
In the midst of a wartime evacuation, a British aeroplane crashes on or near an isolated island in a remote region of the Pacific Ocean. The only survivors are boys in their middle childhood or preadolescence. A fair-haired boy named Ralph and a fat boy named Piggy find a conch, which Ralph uses as a horn to convene the survivors to one area. Ralph immediately commands authority over the other boys using the conch, and is elected their "chief". He establishes three primary policies: to have fun, to survive, and to constantly maintain a smoke signal that could alert passing ships of their presence. Ralph joins a red-haired boy named Jack and a quiet boy named Simon in using Piggy's glasses to create a signal fire.

The semblance of order deteriorates as the majority of the boys turn idle, and ignore Ralph's efforts towards improving life on the island. They develop paranoia around an imaginary monster they call the "beast", which they all gradually believe exists on the island. Ralph fails to convince the boys that no beast exists, while Jack gains popularity by declaring that he will personally hunt and kill the monster. At one point, Jack summons many of the boys to hunt down a wild pig, drawing away those assigned to maintain the signal fire. The smoke signal goes out, failing to attract a ship that was passing by the island. Ralph angrily confronts Jack about his failure to maintain the signal, but he is rebuffed by the other boys. Disillusioned with his role as leader, Ralph considers relinquishing his job, but is persuaded not to do so by Piggy.

One night, an aerial battle occurs near the island while the boys sleep, during which a fighter pilot ejects from his plane and dies in the descent. His body drifts down to the island in his parachute and gets tangled in a tree. Twin boys Sam and Eric see the corpse of the pilot and mistake it for the beast. When Ralph, Jack, and a gloomy boy named Roger later investigate the corpse, they flee, incorrectly believing the beast is real. Jack calls an assembly and tries to turn the others against Ralph, but initially receives no support; he storms off alone to form his own tribe, with most of the other boys gradually joining him.

Simon often ventures out into the island's forest to be alone. One day while he is there, Jack and his followers erect an offering to the beast nearby: a pig's head, mounted on a sharpened stick and swarming with flies. Simon conducts an imaginary dialogue with the head, which he dubs the "Lord of the Flies". The head tells Simon that there is no beast on the island, and predicts that the other boys will turn on him. That night, Ralph and Piggy visit Jack's tribe, learning that they have begun painting their faces and engaging in primitive ritual dances. Simon discovers that the "beast" is the dead pilot, and rushes down to tell Jack's tribe. The frenzied boys, including Ralph and Piggy, mistake Simon for the beast and beat him to death.

Jack and his rebel band decide to steal Piggy’s glasses, the only means the boys have of starting a fire. They raid Ralph's camp, take the glasses, and return to their abode on an outcropping called Castle Rock. Deserted by most of his supporters, Ralph journeys to Castle Rock with Piggy, Sam, and Eric in order to confront Jack and retrieve the glasses. The boys reject Ralph, with Roger triggering a trap that kills Piggy and shatters the conch. Ralph manages to escape, but Sam and Eric are tortured by Roger until they agree to join Jack's tribe.

That night, Ralph secretly confronts Sam and Eric, who warn him that Jack plans to hunt him like a pig and decapitate him. The following morning, Jack's tribe sets fire to the forest, with Ralph narrowly escaping the hunters. Following a long chase, Ralph trips and falls in front of a uniformed adult – a British naval officer whose party has landed to investigate the fire. Ralph, Jack, and the other boys erupt into sobs over the "end of innocence". The officer expresses his disappointment at seeing the boys exhibiting such feral, warlike behaviour before turning "moved and a little embarrassed" to stare at his cruiser waiting offshore.

Themes 
At an allegorical level, the central theme is the conflicting human impulses toward civilisation and social organisation – living by rules, peacefully and in harmony – and toward the will to power. Themes include the tension between groupthink and individuality, between rational and emotional reactions, and between morality and immorality. How these play out and how different people feel their influence form a major subtext of Lord of the Flies, with the central themes addressed in an essay by American literary critic Harold Bloom.

Reception 
The book, originally entitled Strangers from Within, was initially rejected by an in-house reader, Miss Perkins, at London based publishers Faber and Faber as "Rubbish & dull. Pointless". The title was considered "too abstract and too explicit". Following a further review, the book was eventually published as Lord of the Flies.

A turning point occurred when E. M. Forster chose Lord of the Flies as his "outstanding novel of the year." Other reviews described it as "not only a first-rate adventure but a parable of our times". In February 1960, Floyd C. Gale of Galaxy Science Fiction rated Lord of the Flies five stars out of five, stating that "Golding paints a truly terrifying picture of the decay of a minuscule society ... Well on its way to becoming a modern classic".

In his book Moral Minds: How Nature Designed Our Universal Sense of Right and Wrong, Marc D. Hauser says the following about Golding's Lord of the Flies: "This riveting fiction, standard reading in most intro courses to English literature, should be standard reading in biology, economics, psychology, and philosophy."

Its stances on the already controversial subjects of human nature and individual welfare versus the common good earned it position 68 on the American Library Association's list of the 100 most frequently challenged books of 1990–1999. The book has been criticized as "cynical" and portraying humanity exclusively as "selfish creatures". It has been linked with "Tragedy of the commons" by Garrett Hardin and books by Ayn Rand, and countered by "Management of the Commons" by Elinor Ostrom. Parallels have been drawn between the "Lord of the Flies" and an actual incident from 1965 when a group of schoolboys who sailed a fishing boat from Tonga were hit by a storm and marooned on the uninhabited island of ʻAta, considered dead by their relatives in Nuku‘alofa. The group not only managed to survive for over 15 months but "had set up a small commune with food garden, hollowed-out tree trunks to store rainwater, a gymnasium with curious weights, a badminton court, chicken pens and a permanent fire, all from handiwork, an old knife blade and much determination". As a result, when ship captain Peter Warner found them, they were in good health and spirits. Dutch historian Rutger Bregman, writing about this situation said that Golding's portrayal was unrealistic.
 It was awarded a place on both lists of Modern Library 100 Best Novels, reaching number 41 on the editor's list, and 25 on the reader's list.
 In 2003, the novel was listed at number 70 on the BBC's survey The Big Read.
 In 2005, the novel was chosen by Time magazine as one of the 100 best English-language novels from 1923 to 2005. Time also included the novel in its list of the 100 Best Young-Adult Books of All Time.

Popular in schools, especially in the English-speaking world, a 2016 UK poll saw Lord of the Flies ranked third in the nation's favourite books from school, behind George Orwell’s Animal Farm and Charles Dickens’ Great Expectations.

On 5 November 2019, BBC News listed Lord of the Flies on its list of the 100 most inspiring novels.

In other media

Film 
There have been three film adaptations based on the book:
 Lord of the Flies (1963), directed by Peter Brook
 Alkitrang Dugo (1975), a Filipino film, directed by Lupita A. Concio
 Lord of the Flies (1990), directed by Harry Hook

A fourth adaptation, to feature an all-female cast, was announced by Warner Bros. in August 2017, but was subsequently abandoned. In July 2019, director Luca Guadagnino was said to be in negotiations for a conventionally cast version. Ladyworld, an all-female adaptation, was released in 2018.

Stage 
Nigel Williams adapted the text for the stage.
It was debuted by the Royal Shakespeare Company in July 1996.
The Pilot Theatre Company has toured it extensively in the United Kingdom and elsewhere.

In October 2014 it was announced that the 2011 production of Lord of the Flies would return to conclude the 2015 season at the Regent's Park Open Air Theatre ahead of a major UK tour. The production was to be directed by the Artistic Director Timothy Sheader who won the 2014 Whatsonstage.com Awards Best Play Revival for  To Kill a Mockingbird.

Kansas-based Orange Mouse Theatricals and Mathew Klickstein produced a topical, gender-bending adaptation called Ladies of the Fly that was co-written by a group of young girls (ages 8–16) based on both the original text and their own lives.  The production was performed by the girls themselves as an immersive live-action show in August 2018.

Radio 
In June 2013, BBC Radio 4 Extra broadcast a dramatisation by Judith Adams in four 30-minute episodes directed by Sasha Yevtushenko. The cast included Ruth Wilson as "The Narrator", Finn Bennett as "Ralph", Richard Linnel as "Jack", Caspar Hilton-Hilley as "Piggy" and Jack Caine as "Simon".

 Fire on the Mountain
 Painted Faces
 Beast from the Air
 Gift for Darkness

Influence 

Many writers have borrowed plot elements from Lord of the Flies. By the early 1960s, it was required reading in many schools and colleges.

Literature
Author Stephen King uses the name Castle Rock, from the mountain fort in Lord of the Flies, as a fictional town that has appeared in a number of his novels. The book itself appears prominently in his novels Hearts in Atlantis (1999), Misery (1987), and Cujo (1981).

King wrote an introduction for a new edition of Lord of the Flies (2011) to mark the centenary of William Golding's birth in 1911.

King's fictional town of Castle Rock inspired the name of Rob Reiner's production company, Castle Rock Entertainment, which produced the film Lord of the Flies (1990).

Music
Iron Maiden wrote a song inspired by the book, included in their 1995 album The X Factor.

The Filipino indie pop/alternative rock outfit The Camerawalls include a song entitled "Lord of the Flies" on their 2008 album Pocket Guide to the Otherworld.

Editions

See also 
 Batavia (1628 ship)
 The Coral Island: A Tale of the Pacific Ocean (1858), novel by R. M. Ballantyne with a similar premise but an opposite perspective
 "Das Bus", an episode of The Simpsons with a similar plot
 Heart of Darkness (1899), short novel by Joseph Conrad
 A High Wind in Jamaica
 Island mentality
 Robbers Cave Experiment
 State of nature
 Two Years' Vacation (1888), adventure novel by Jules Verne

References

External links 

 Chapter 1: "The Sound of the Shell" of the novel Lord of the Flies by William Golding on eNotes
 Lord of the Flies student guide and teacher resources; themes, quotes, characters, study questions
 Reading and teaching guide from Faber and Faber, the book's UK publisher
 An interview with Judy Golding, the author's daughter, in which she discusses the inspiration for the book, and the reasons for its enduring legacy
  run and administered by the William Golding Estate
 The real Lord of the Flies: what happened when six boys were shipwrecked for 15 months About a real life incident in 1965; reality had a much more positive outcome than Golding's book.

1954 British novels
Allegory
British adventure novels
British novels adapted into films
British philosophical novels
British young adult novels
Castaways in fiction
Dystopian novels
English philosophical novels
Existentialist novels
Faber and Faber books
Novels about survival skills
Novels by William Golding
Novels set in Oceania
Novels set on uninhabited islands
Pigs in literature
Postmodern novels
1954 debut novels
Novels set on fictional islands